The Mixed 4 × 400 metres relay competition at the 2018 Asian Games in Jakarta was held on 28 August 2018 at the Gelora Bung Karno Stadium. This event made its debut in 2018 Asian Games in Jakarta. India claimed the gold medal in this event, Kazakhstan and China took silver and bronze medals respectively.

Bahrain originally won the gold medal, however, the Athletics Federation of India lodged a protest against Bahrain for  obstructing Hima Das during the Final. After passing on the baton to Salwa Eid Naser, Bahrain's Kemi Adekoya fell in the path of Hima Das, obstructing her way. However, the protest was rejected by the Asian Games' Jury of Appeals.

In the event, after Adekoya tested positive for stanozolol in January 2019, the Athletics Integrity Unit ordered that her results from 24 August 2018 be deleted from the records, thus disqualifying the Bahrainian team.

Schedule
All times are Western Indonesia Time (UTC+07:00)

Results

 Bahrain originally won the gold medal, but were disqualified after Kemi Adekoya tested positive for stanozolol. The Athletics Integrity Unit also ordered that Adekoya's results from 24 August 2018 be deleted from the records.

References

External links
Official Result Book – Athletics

Mixed 4 x 400 metres relay
2018